Old Channal is a small village in Mahalingpur, district Bagalkot, Karnataka, India. It is located near the village of Channal.

References

Villages in Bagalkot district